Expandable Language is an album by American jazz saxophonist Oliver Lake recorded in 1984 for the Italian Black Saint label.

Reception
The Allmusic review by Scott Yanow awarded the album 4½ stars stating "This free bop session (which is often quite free but often has a strong pulse) is one of altoist Oliver Lake's more rewarding sessions".

Track listing
All compositions by Oliver Lake
 "Expandable Language" - 7:48
 "Comous" - 5:20
 "N.S." - 5:50
 "Page Four" - 5:20
 "Soons" - 7:23
 "Everybody Knows That" - 5:29
Recorded at Vanguard Studios in New York City on September 17 & 20, 1984

Personnel
Oliver Lake - alto saxophone, soprano saxophone, flute
Kevin Eubanks - guitar
Geri Allen - piano
Fred Hopkins - bass
Pheeroan akLaff - drums

References

Black Saint/Soul Note albums
Oliver Lake albums
1984 albums